Paul Mehlitz (25 December 1906 – 7 December 1982) was a German field hockey player who competed in the 1936 Summer Olympics. He was a member of the German field hockey team, which won the silver medal. He played two matches as forward.

References

External links
 

1906 births
1982 deaths
Field hockey players at the 1936 Summer Olympics
German male field hockey players
Olympic field hockey players of Germany
Olympic silver medalists for Germany
Olympic medalists in field hockey
Medalists at the 1936 Summer Olympics